Deh Now-e Khvajeh (also Romanized as Deh Now-e Khvājeh, Deh-e Now-e Khvājeh, Deh-e Now Khvājeh, Dehnow Khajeh, and Dehnow Khvājeh; also known as Deh-i-Nāu and Deh-e Now) is a village in Faramarzan Rural District, Jenah District, Bastak County, Hormozgan Province, Iran. At the 2006 census, its population was 220, in 57 families.

References 

Populated places in Bastak County